Major Sir Charles James Buchanan, 4th Baronet (16 April 1899 – 25 May 1984) was High Sheriff of Nottinghamshire in 1962.

Family

He was born on 16 April 1899, the son of Sir Eric Alexander Buchanan, 3rd Baronet and Constance Augusta Tennant. He married Barbara Helen Stanley, daughter of Lt.-Col. Rt. Hon. Sir George Frederick Stanley and Lady Beatrix Taylour on 23 February 1932. He worked for George Frederick Stanley who was Governor of Madras, and Charles Buchanan was his Aide-de-camp.
The children from this marriage were:
Georgina Mary Gabrielle Buchanan (b. 15 Dec 1932)
Constance Carolyn Buchanan (b. 31 Dec 1934)
Sir Andrew George Buchanan, 5th Baronet (b. 21 Jul 1937)
Hugh Charles Stanley Buchanan (b. 26 Aug 1942)

Career

He was educated at Windlesham House and Harrow School and the Royal Military College, Sandhurst. He gained the rank of Major in the service of the Highland Light Infantry. He fought in the Russian Civil War in 1919, in the North Russia Relief Force. He was Aide-de-camp to the List of colonial Governors and Presidents of Madras Presidency between 1928 and 1932 (one of whom, George Frederick Stanley, was his future father-in-law) and he fought in the Second World War

He succeeded to the title of 4th Baronet Buchanan, of Dunburgh on 29 July 1928. 

He was admitted to Royal Company of Archers in 1930.

He held the office of Justice of the Peace for Nottinghamshire in 1952. He held the office of Deputy Lieutenant of Nottinghamshire in 1954. He held the office of High Sheriff of Nottinghamshire in 1962.

He died in 1984.

Arms

References

1899 births
1984 deaths
Baronets in the Baronetage of the United Kingdom
People educated at Harrow School
Graduates of the Royal Military College, Sandhurst
Highland Light Infantry officers
Deputy Lieutenants of Nottinghamshire
High Sheriffs of Nottinghamshire
Members of the Royal Company of Archers
British Army personnel of World War I
British Army personnel of the Russian Civil War
People educated at Windlesham House School